Lake Tahoe is a 2008 Mexican drama film, directed by Fernando Eimbcke.

It premiered at the Berlin International Film Festival in Germany on February 9, 2008 and won ten awards, including two Silver Ariels for best supporting actor (Hector Herrera) and best director. The film follows a teenage boy who has crashed the family car and his prolonged attempts to find a new engine part to fix it. His and his family's grief at his father's recent death are also shown. The title is derived from a Lake Tahoe bumper sticker on the car.

References

External links

2008 drama films
2008 films
Best Picture Ariel Award winners
Films directed by Fernando Eimbcke
Films set in Mexico
2000s Spanish-language films
Mexican drama films
2000s Mexican films